The LSU Tigers women's  basketball team represents Louisiana State University in NCAA Division I women's college basketball. The team’s head coach is Kim Mulkey, the former head coach at Baylor University, who was hired on April 25, 2021 to replace Nikki Fargas, who had been head coach since the 2011-2012 season. The team plays its home games in the Pete Maravich Assembly Center located on the LSU campus in Baton Rouge, Louisiana.

History
Through the 2018–2019 season, LSU has made 27 AIAW/NCAA tournament appearances including 14 Sweet Sixteens, eight Elite Eights, and five Final Fours. The Lady Tigers have won the SEC regular season championship three times and the SEC Tournament championship twice.

Coleman-Swanner era
The LSU women's basketball team started play in 1975 as the "Ben-Gals," with coach Jinks Coleman. In just their second season of play, the team made it to the AIAW national championship game before losing to top-ranked Delta State, 68–55. Coleman stepped down in the middle of the 1978–1979 season and was replaced by Barbara Swanner, who in turn led the team for three and a half seasons. The 1981-1982 season saw the NCAA become the governing body of collegiate women's basketball. LSU did not play in the first NCAA tournament.

Sue Gunter era
Future Hall of Fame coach Sue Gunter was hired to replace Swanner. Gunter would lead the Lady Tigers for the next 22 seasons. Gunter led the Lady Tigers to 14 NCAA tournament appearances. Although she only won three regular season titles, for most of her tenure the SEC was dominated by national powers Tennessee, Auburn and Ole Miss. Gunter took a medical leave of absence in the middle of the 2003–04 season. Her top assistant, Pokey Chatman, who had played for Gunter in the late 1980s and early 1990s and served as an assistant coach since the end of her playing days, took over as interim coach and led the Tigers to their first Final Four. However, Gunter was still officially head coach, and LSU credits the entire season to her. Gunter retired after the season, and Chatman was named her permanent successor.

Pokey Chatman era
Pokey Chatman led the team to two more consecutive Final Four appearances and was highly regarded as coach. However, during the 2006–2007 season, just prior to the NCAA Tournament, Chatman resigned after allegations of improper conduct with a former player surfaced. She was replaced on an interim basis by longtime assistant Bob Starkey, who coached the team during the 2007 NCAA tournament, leading them to a fourth consecutive Final Four.

Van Chancellor era
Van Chancellor, the former head coach for Ole Miss and the Houston Comets, was hired at the end of the 2006–2007 season as a permanent replacement. In his first year as coach, Chancellor led the Lady Tigers to the SEC regular season championship. The Lady Tigers were runner-up in the 2008 SEC women's basketball tournament and made the NCAA Final Four for a fifth consecutive year. LSU joined UConn as the only two schools ever to reach five consecutive Final Fours.

Nikki Fargas era
On April 2, 2011, LSU hired Nikki Caldwell, later Nikki Fargas, to replace Chancellor as head coach of the Lady Tigers. Fargas played as Nikki Caldwell at the University of Tennessee under Hall of Fame coach Pat Summitt. During her tenure as head coach at LSU, Fargas led the Lady Tigers to five NCAA Division I women's basketball tournament appearances in 2012, 2013, 2014, 2015 and 2017.

Fargas resigned as head coach on April 24, 2021 to become president of the WNBA's Las Vegas Aces.

Kim Mulkey era 
On April 25, 2021, LSU announced the signing of Kim Mulkey to replace Fargas as head coach. Mulkey played at Louisiana Tech, where she also went on to be an assistant and associate head coach for 15 years. Prior to accepting the offer to coach LSU, she was the head coach for Baylor University, where she won three national championships in 21 seasons.

On December 2, 2021, Mulkey led the team to their first win versus a ranked team by defeating #14 Iowa State 69-60 in the Maravich Center giving the team a 7-1 record for the year.

Championships

Final Fours
LSU has played in five Final Fours in the NCAA Women's Division I Basketball Championship tournament.

Conference championships
LSU has won three regular-season conference championships and two conference tournament championships in the Southeastern Conference (SEC).

Year by year results

Conference tournament winners noted with # Source:

Postseason

NCAA Tournament history & seeds

NCAA Division I

AIAW Division I
The Lady Tigers made one appearance in the AIAW National Division I basketball tournament, with a combined record of 3–1.

Player awards

National awards

John R. Wooden Award
Seimone Augustus - 2005, 2006
Naismith College Player of the Year
Seimone Augustus - 2005, 2006
Associated Press Women's College Basketball Player of the Year
Seimone Augustus - 2005, 2006
Nancy Lieberman Award
Temeka Johnson - 2005

Senior CLASS Award
Seimone Augustus - 2006
USBWA National Freshman of the Year
Seimone Augustus - 2003
Wade Trophy
Seimone Augustus - 2005, 2006

SEC Awards
Player of the Year Award
Seimone Augustus - 2005, 2006
Sylvia Fowles - 2008

Prominent players

Retired numbers

LSU All-Americans

Arena

Pete Maravich Assembly Center

The Pete Maravich Assembly Center is a 13,215-seat multi-purpose arena in Baton Rouge, Louisiana. The arena opened in 1972 and is home of the LSU Lady Tigers basketball team. It was originally known as the LSU Assembly Center, but was renamed in honor of Pete Maravich, a Tiger basketball legend, shortly after his death in 1988. The Maravich Center is known to locals as "The PMAC" or "The Palace that Pete Built," or by its more nationally known nickname, "The Deaf Dome," coined by Dick Vitale.

The slightly oval building is located directly to the north of Tiger Stadium, and its bright-white roof can be seen in many telecasts of that stadium.  The arena concourse is divided into four quadrants: Pete Maravich Pass, The Walk of Champions, Heroes Hall and Midway of Memories. The quadrants highlight former LSU Tiger athletes, individual and team awards and memorabilia pertaining to the history of LSU Lady Tigers and LSU Tigers basketball teams.

Practice and Training facilities

LSU Basketball Practice Facility

The LSU Basketball Practice Facility is the practice facility for the LSU Lady Tigers basketball and LSU Tigers basketball teams. The facility is connected to the Pete Maravich Assembly Center through the Northwest portal. The facility features separate, full-size duplicate gymnasiums for the women's and men's basketball teams. They include a regulation NCAA court in length with two regulation high school courts in the opposition direction. The courts are exact replicas of the Maravich Center game court and have two portable goals and four retractable goals. The gymnasiums are equipped with a scoreboard, video filming balcony and scorer's table with video and data connection. The facility also houses team locker rooms, a team lounge, training rooms, a coach's locker room and coach's offices.

The building also includes a two-story lobby and staircase that ascends to the second level where a club room is used for pre-game and post-game events and is connected to the Pete Maravich Assembly Center concourse. The lobby includes team displays and graphics, trophy cases and memorabilia of LSU basketball. A 900-pound bronze statue of LSU legend Shaquille O'Neal is located in front of the facility.

LSU Strength and Conditioning facility
 
The LSU Tigers basketball strength training and conditioning facility is located in the LSU Strength and Conditioning facility. Built in 1997, it is located adjacent to Tiger Stadium. Measuring 10,000-square feet with a flat surface, it has 28 multi-purpose power stations, 36 assorted sectorized machines and 10 dumbbell stations along with a plyometric specific area, medicine balls, hurdles, plyometric boxes and assorted speed and agility equipment. It also features 2 treadmills, 4 stationary bikes, 2 elliptical cross trainers, a stepper and step mill.

Head coaches

References

External links
 

 
Basketball teams established in 1975
1975 establishments in Louisiana